

The CARMAM 15-36 Aiglon ("Eaglet") was a French sailplane produced in the 1970s. It was designed as a private venture by the technical directors of CARMAM, intending it to be a simple and easy-to-fly basic glider for aeroclub use. It was a conventional sailplane design of fibreglass construction throughout, with a low tail.

A variant was also marketed for homebuilding as the 15-34 Kit-Club. Pottier revised the original design to simplify it somewhat, and replaced much of the fibreglass structure with a plywood fuselage and fabric-covered wing and tail. These structural changes resulted in a weight penalty of around 30 kg (66 lb), but performance remained very similar.

Variants
15-36Abasic production version
15-36AR15-36A with provision for 55 kg (121 lb) of water ballast
15-3415-36A redesigned for homebuilding

Specifications (15-36A)

References

See also

1970s French sailplanes
Glider aircraft
Aircraft first flown in 1974